Inteha is a 2003 Indian Hindi-language psychological thriller film released on 24 October 2003. It was produced by Mukesh Bhatt and directed by Vikram Bhatt, and stars Ashmit Patel and Vidya Malvade in their film debut along with Nauheed Cyrusi.

Plot
Nandini leaves the bright lights of Mumbai to settle in the hill town of Koti (which is actually Ooty) to look after her younger sister Tina after the demise of their father. Tina is a spoilt brat who despises elder sister -- she thinks she is interfering and should mind her own business. Tina finds out she's being watched and photographed by a young handsome stranger who seems rather taken with her. When she finally meets him face-to-face, she is smitten by his dark, dangerous looks. While Tina and Ranbir find passion, Nandini brews tension. She does not trust the stranger (we don't know anything about his past, she says). But she tries to know him better to make Tina happy. Then, the twist -- a murder in a hotel convinces Nandini that all is not hunky-dory with the hunk. She begins to uncover clues to Ranbir's dark past.

As Nandini gets closer to Ranbir's real identity, Tina refuses to believe her sister. Ranbir threatens Nandini until she has to apologise for reporting him to the police by saying sorry. S-O-R-R-Y. Nandini is helpless. Especially when her life is threatened. Finally, she signs everything over to little sister and seems to head out of town. What she actually does is search for more clues to Ranbir.

Cast 
Ashmit Patel as Ranbir Oberoi / Vikram Rathod / Rakesh Sharma
Vidya Malvade as  Nandini Saxena
Anup Soni as  Rohit
Nauheed Cyrusi as Tina Saxena
Avtar Gill as Advocate Ranjit S. Thakur
Aanjjan Srivastav as  Mohanlal
Prithvi Zutshi as  Mr. Saxena
Rushali Arora
Jihangir Khan

Soundtrack 

The soundtrack of Inteha was composed by Anu Malik. Lyrics were written by Rahat Indori, Praveen Bhardwaj and Dev Kohli. Though Shreya Ghoshal was credited in the track "Ab Humse Akele Raha Jaaye Na", the female vocals for the song have originally been given by Alka Yagnik.

Track listing

Critical response
Taran Adarsh of IndiaFM gave the film 1 star out of 5, writing "On the whole, INTEHA has more minuses than plusses. At the box-office, due to tough competition with other films in its week of release and no hype or publicity to back it up, INTEHA will find it difficult to survive. Below average." Anita Bora of Rediff.com wrote "With thrillers, the key is getting all the ingredients right. Else, it turns a little comical. Unfortunately, that is where Inteha suffers. Besides a few small shocks, there is not much left to the viewer's imagination. In the end, neither the decent music nor the commendable effort from its cast can save Inteha. All I can say is -- you might be better off this Diwali watching the lights in the sky. Else, be warned, you could be sorry. Really S-O-R-R-Y!!"

References

External links 

2003 films
Indian erotic thriller films
2000s erotic thriller films
Films directed by Vikram Bhatt
2000s Hindi-language films
2000s Urdu-language films
Films scored by Anu Malik
Indian serial killer films
Indian psychological thriller films
2000s serial killer films